Peter Franco (November 27, 1973) is an audio engineer and music producer. Franco was first recognized for his work in 2007 on Daft Punk's Alive 2007 album. He recorded, and assisted in mixing Random Access Memories by Daft Punk in 2013, winning the 2014 Grammy Award for Best Engineered Album, Non-Classical. He has been one of four engineers for Daft Punk studio recordings since 2008.

Discography

References

External links
 

Year of birth missing (living people)
Living people
Record producers